The Neglected Wife is a 1917 American drama film serial directed by William Bertram.

Cast
 Ruth Roland as Margaret Warner
 Roland Bottomley as Horace Kennedy
 Corinne Grant as Mary Kennedy
 Neil Hardin as Edgar Doyle (as Neil C. Hardin)
 Philo McCullough as Frank Norwood
 Mollie McConnell

Episodes
The serial consisted of fifteen two reel episodes, released from May 13 to August 5, 1917:

The Woman Alone
Weakening
In the Crucible
Beyond Recall
Under Suspicion
On the Precipice
The Message on the Mirror
A Relentless Fate
Deepening Degradation
A Veiled Intrigue
A Reckless Indiscretion
Embittered Love
Revolting Pride
Desperation
A Sacrifice Supreme

Reception
Like many American films of the time, The Neglected Wife was subject to cuts by city and state film censorship boards. For example, the Chicago Board of Censors required these cuts in these three episodes: Episode 11, throwing brick down on man, stealing key from rack, stealing letters, and throwing man into burning house; Episode 12, the intertitle "Or I will have you ejected by complaining that you are what you are -"; and Episode 13, thugs shooting from boat, two holdup scenes, attack on girl and gagging, shooting from window, and the intertitles "We must get the girl - to go back to him", "You have ruined Margaret Warner and the Veiled Woman", and "You will return to Kennedy or -".

See also
 List of film serials
 List of film serials by studio

References

External links

1917 films
Silent American drama films
American silent serial films
Pathé Exchange film serials
1917 drama films
American black-and-white films
Films directed by William Bertram
1910s American films